Ptakowice  is a village in the administrative district of Gmina Lewin Brzeski, within Brzeg County, Opole Voivodeship, in southern Poland.

The name of the village is of Polish origin and comes from the word ptak, which means "bird".

Transport
The Voivodeship road 458 runs through Ptakowice and the A4 motorway runs nearby, south of the village.

References

Ptakowice